The Galilei-covariant tensor formulation is a method for treating non-relativistic physics using the extended Galilei group as the representation group of the theory. It is constructed in the light cone of a five dimensional manifold.

Takahashi et al., in 1988, began a study of Galilean symmetry, where an explicitly covariant non-relativistic field theory could be developed. The theory is constructed in the light cone of a (4,1) Minkowski space. Previously, in 1985, Duval et al. constructed a similar tensor formulation in the context of Newton–Cartan theory. Some other authors also have developed a similar Galilean tensor formalism.

Galilean manifold 
The Galilei transformations are

 

where  stands for the three-dimensional Euclidean rotations,  is the relative velocity determining Galilean boosts, a stands for spatial translations and b, for time translations.

We can then define a 5-vector,
 ,

Thus, we can define a scalar product of the type

 

where

 

Extended Galilei algebra 
A five dimensional Poincaré algebra leaves the metric  invariant,

 

We can write the generators as

 

The non-vanishing commutation relations will then be rewritten as

 

An important Lie subalgebra is

 

 is the generator of time translations (Hamiltonian), Pi is the generator of spatial translations (momentum operator),  is the generator of Galilean boosts, and  stands for a generator of rotations (angular momentum operator).

Bargmann structures 
In 1985 Duval, Burdet and Kunzle showed that four-dimensional Newton–Cartan theory of gravitation can be reformulated as Kaluza–Klein reduction of five-dimensional Einstein gravity along a null-like direction. The metric used is the same as the Galilean metric but with all positive entries

This lifting is considered to be useful for non-relativistic holographic models. Gravitational models in this framework have been shown to precisely calculate the mercury precession.

See also 

 Galilean group
 Representation theory of the Galilean group
 Lorentz group
 Poincaré group
 Pauli–Lubanski pseudovector

References 

Theoretical physics
Rotational symmetry
Quantum mechanics
Representation theory of Lie groups